A Different Sea is a studio album by The Gufs, released seven years after their last album, Holiday From You.  The album features string arrangements from the Milwaukee Symphony.

Track listing
Source:  CDFreedom.com

Personnel 
 Goran Kralj – lead vocals, guitar, piano
 Dejan Kralj – bass guitar
 Morgan Dawley – lead guitar, backup vocals
 Scott Schwebel – drums, percussion

External links
The Gufs Official Website

References

2006 albums
The Gufs albums